The 1986–87 DePaul Blue Demons men's basketball team represented DePaul University during the 1986–87 NCAA Division I men's basketball season. They were led by head coach Joey Meyer, in his 3rd season at the school, and played their home games at the Rosemont Horizon in Rosemont.

After opening the season unranked in both major polls, the Blue Demons won their first 16 games and rose as high as No. 4 in the AP poll. DePaul received a bid to the 1987 NCAA Tournament as the No. 3 seed in the Midwest region. DePaul beat Louisiana Tech in the opening round and St. John's in the round of 32 to advance to the Sweet Sixteen. In the Midwest Regional semifinals, the Blue Demons were upset by LSU, 63–58, and finished the season 28–3 and ranked No. 5 in both major polls.

Roster

Schedule and results

|-
!colspan=9 style=| Regular season

|-
!colspan=12 style=| NCAA Tournament

Source:

Rankings

Team players drafted into the NBA

References 

DePaul Blue Demons men's basketball seasons
DePaul
1986 in sports in Illinois
1987 in sports in Illinois
DePaul